Ajith Christopher Alirajah (born 25 September 1968) is a Sri Lankan former cricketer. He played thirteen first-class matches for Nondescripts Cricket Club between 1988 and 1991. He was also part of Sri Lanka's squad for the 1988 Youth Cricket World Cup. He pursued his primary and secondary education at Saint Joseph's College, Colombo. He also played school cricket for St. Joseph's College.

He later pursued his career in banking. He began his banking career at Standard Chartered and then worked as an Assistant General Manager in Trade Finance Services Department at Cargills Bank before becoming the Departmental Head of Trade Finance Services Department at Cargills Bank.

References

External links
 

1968 births
Living people
Sri Lankan cricketers
Nondescripts Cricket Club cricketers
Cricketers from Colombo
Sri Lankan academics
Sri Lankan bankers
Sri Lankan Christians